Antonio Notario Caro (born 19 November 1972) is a Spanish former professional footballer who played as a goalkeeper.

In a ten-year professional career – he did not reach La Liga or Segunda División until the age of nearly 28 – he appeared in 229 matches in representation of four teams, mainly Sevilla.

Club career
Notario was born in Mataró, Barcelona, Catalonia. During his early career he played mostly with Andalusian clubs, beginning at Granada CF (two stints) then appearing for Valencia CF's reserves, Real Murcia, Polideportivo Almería and Guadix CF, with all of the clubs competing in Segunda División B.

In summer 2000, Notario moved to Sevilla FC where he would have his most successful years, being promoted to La Liga in his first season and retaining first-choice status until the 2005–06 campaign, with the arrival of Andrés Palop relegating him to the bench. He would, however, appear in eight matches in the side's victorious run in the UEFA Cup.

Notario achieved once again top flight promotion in 2006–07, as he returned to Murcia after 12 years. He was also starter for most of the following season until new boss Javier Clemente promoted Uruguayan Fabián Carini to the starting XI, with the team being nonetheless relegated.

In August 2008, Notario joined Segunda División club RC Celta de Vigo. After a sole season – marred by disciplinary and contractual problems– the 36-year-old signed with Albacete Balompié also in that level, penning a one-year contract.

On 10 October 2009, Notario was involved in a punching session with former team Celta's David Català, at the end of the 1–1 draw at Balaídos. He was subsequently handed a four-match ban – later reduced to two – and, upon his return, found himself playing second-fiddle to Jesús Cabrero more often than not, being released at the end of the campaign and retiring from football.

Honours
Sevilla
UEFA Cup: 2005–06
Segunda División: 2000–01

References

External links

1972 births
Living people
People from Mataró
Sportspeople from the Province of Barcelona
Spanish footballers
Footballers from Catalonia
Association football goalkeepers
La Liga players
Segunda División players
Segunda División B players
Granada CF footballers
Valencia CF Mestalla footballers
Real Murcia players
CP Almería players
Sevilla FC players
UEFA Cup winning players
RC Celta de Vigo players
Albacete Balompié players
Spain youth international footballers
Spain under-23 international footballers